"The Royal Anthem of Jordan" is the national anthem of Jordan, adopted in 1946. The lyrics were written by ʿAbdel Munʿim al-Rifāʿī, and the music was composed by ʿAbdul al-Qādir al-Tanīr. The first version of the lyrics was very short, as it only contained the first stanza of the current version. Since then, the anthem has been expanded. The abridged version of the anthem is usually used, while the full version is reserved for special occasions.

Lyrics

Notes

References

External links
 Jordan: Al-salam Al-malaki Al-urdoni (Royal Anthem of Jordan) - Audio of the national anthem of Jordan, with information and lyrics (archive link)
 The full vocal version of The National Anthem of Jordan performed by a military band with mixed chorus in the early 80's. (YouTube) (archive link)
 Instrumental version of "As-salam al-malaki al-urdoni" in RealAudio
 Himnuszok – a vocal version of the full Anthem, featured on szbszig's "Himnuszok" website. The song is performed by a military band with mixed chorus. The full version is only played for special occasions like the King's Birthday.

National anthems
Asian anthems
Jordanian monarchy
Jordanian music
Royal anthems
National symbols of Jordan
National anthem compositions in F major